Rhiwsaeson is a village and district of the principal town and community of Llantrisant with the County Borough of Rhondda Cynon Taf in South Wales.  It is located on the south easterly outskirts of the town, along the Afon Clun, south of the A473 and near the village of Groes-faen (Pontyclun) and Creigiau within North West Cardiff.

References 

Villages in Rhondda Cynon Taf